Antonio de la Cerda, 7th Duke of Medinaceli, Grandee of Spain, (in full), (25 October 1607 – 7 March 1671) was a Spanish nobleman.

He was the son of Don Juan de la Cerda, 6th Duke of Medinaceli, by second wife Doña Antonia de Toledo y Dávila. On 28 November 1625, in Dos Hermanas, province of Sevilla, at the age of 17 he married the 13-year-old Ana Portocarrero, 5th Duchess of Alcalá, with whom he had four children. In 1641, he was appointed viceroy of Valencia, position he held for one year. He died in Madrid.

Sources

1607 births
1671 deaths
Antonio de la Cerda
Marquesses of Cogolludo
Marquesses of la Laguna
Counts of Puerto de Santa María
Antonio
Knights of the Order of Alcántara
Viceroys of Valencia
Grandees of Spain